Elections to Daventry District Council  in Northamptonshire, England were held on 1 May 2008. One third of the council was up for election and the Conservative Party stayed in overall control of the council.

No seats changed hands at the election with the Conservative Party winning 10 of the 12 seats up for election. The British National Party were pleased with the second place they achieved in Drayton ward feeling they could build on the performance but the other parties were happy that they had been defeated.

After the election, the composition of the council was:
Conservative 35
Liberal Democrat 2
Labour 1

Election result

Two Conservative candidates were unopposed.

Ward results

References

2008 Daventry election result
Elections - results
Daventry Election results

2008 English local elections
2008
2000s in Northamptonshire